The LUGM-145 was an Iraqi produced naval moored contact mine. The mine had a 145 kilogram explosive warhead. In February 1991, during the Gulf War,  struck a LUGM-145 mine, losing a third of its fuel, and sustaining damage that would cost 3.5 million US dollars to repair.

Notes

References
 

Naval mines
Weapons of Iraq